Michael Qualls (born January 20, 1994) is an American professional basketball player for the TaiwanBeer HeroBears of the T1 League. He played college basketball for the Arkansas Razorbacks and is most notably remembered for his go-ahead slam dunk with 0.2 seconds left in overtime against Kentucky in 2014.

High school career
Qualls attended Huntington High School where he led them to four district championships, including a senior season in which he averaged 17.8 points per game, guiding Huntington to 33 wins, making him the third-ranked player in the state of Louisiana in the class of 2012, with an ESPN.com scout grade of 89.

College career
After graduating high school, Qualls attended Arkansas, where he appeared in 100 games (56 starts) and averaged 11.0 points, 4.5 rebounds and 1.5 assists in 23.8 minutes per game. Conference|SEC]] after averaging 15.9 points per game. He decided to forgo his final year of college eligibility and declared for the 2015 NBA draft. Qualls is perhaps best known for his slam dunk at the buzzer to beat Kentucky 87–85 in overtime at Bud Walton Arena on January 14, 2014. It was the #1 play on the ESPN Sportscenter Top 10 plays of the day, and is considered one of the greatest moments in Razorbacks basketball history.

Professional career
During a workout with the Phoenix Suns prior to the 2015 draft, Qualls tore his ACL and was ruled out for six to 12 months. Despite the injury, Qualls managed to land an NBA training camp deal, signing with the Oklahoma City Thunder on September 29, 2015. He was later waived by the Thunder on October 22 prior to the start of the regular season. On November 3, he was acquired by the Oklahoma City Blue as an affiliate player from the Thunder. On November 11, he was waived by the Blue.

On August 7, 2016, Qualls signed with Hapoel Gilboa Galil of the Israeli League. On October 10, 2016, he made his professional debut in a 77–61 loss to Hapoel Holon, recording 15 points, five rebounds and one assist in 25 minutes off the bench.

On September 23, 2017, Qualls signed with the Italian team Pallacanestro Cantù for the 2017–18 season. On October 25, 2017, he parted ways with Cantù after appearing in two games. On December 13, 2017, he was acquired by the Salt Lake City Stars of the NBA G League. On March 5, 2018, he was waived by the Stars after averaging 8.4 points, 4.7 rebounds and 1.1 assists in 19.4 minutes in 18 games. Three days later, he was acquired by the Texas Legends.

Qualls was drafted in the fourth round of the 2018 NBA G League draft by the Wisconsin Herd.

In October 2019, he signed with the NorthPort Batang Pier of the Philippine Basketball Association (PBA) to replace Mychal Ammons as the team's import for the 2019 PBA Governors' Cup.

On February 23, 2020, Qualls signed with Al-Fateh of the Saudi Basketball League. On August 18, 2021, Qualls signed with SCM U Craiova of the Liga Națională.

On December 22, 2022, Qualls returned to the Philippines as he signed with the Rain or Shine Elasto Painters of the Philippine Basketball Association (PBA) as the team's import for the 2023 PBA Governors' Cup.

On March 3, 2023, Qualls signed with TaiwanBeer HeroBears of the T1 League.

The Basketball Tournament
Michael Qualls played for Team Arkansas in the 2018 edition of The Basketball Tournament. In 2 games, he averaged 22.5 points, 6 rebounds, and 1.5 blocks per game. Team Arkansas reached the second round before falling to the Talladega Knights.

Personal life
The son of Anthony and grandson of Vera Thrash, Qualls has a son named Michael Jr. He majored in recreation and sports management.

References

External links 
NBADraft.net profile
76ers draft profile

1994 births
Living people
Al Riyadi Club Beirut basketball players
American expatriate basketball people in Lebanon
American expatriate basketball people in Israel
American expatriate basketball people in Italy
American expatriate basketball people in the Philippines
American men's basketball players
Arkansas Razorbacks men's basketball players
Basketball players from Shreveport, Louisiana
Hapoel Gilboa Galil Elyon players
Lega Basket Serie A players
NorthPort Batang Pier players
Pallacanestro Cantù players
Rain or Shine Elasto Painters players
Philippine Basketball Association imports
Salt Lake City Stars players
Shooting guards
Texas Legends players
Wisconsin Herd players
TaiwanBeer HeroBears players
T1 League imports